Kheyrabad (also Romanized as Kheyrābād) is a village in Eshqabad Rural District, Miyan Jolgeh District, Nishapur County, Razavi Khorasan Province, Iran. At the 2006 census, its population was 272, in 69 families.

References 

Populated places in Nishapur County